Parliamentary elections were held in the Republic of the Congo on 14 June 1959. The result was a victory for the Democratic Union for the Defense of African Interests, which won 51 of the 61 seats.

Results

References

Congo
1959 in the Republic of the Congo
Elections in the Republic of the Congo